Mette Kynne Fransen (born 1960) is CEO and Partner at Henning Larsen Architects. She has been a part of the management team at the company since 1998 and was appointed CEO in 2003.

Mette Kynne Frandsen holds a number of positions of trust. She is deputy chair of the board in The Trade Council of Denmark and in The Royal Danish Academy of Fine Arts, Schools of Architecture, Design and Conservation. She is also a member of the board at JP/Politikens Hus - a Danish news media agency.

In 2012, she was elected Female Role Model of the Year by a design building industry magazine.

References 

1960 births
Living people
Danish chief executives
20th-century Danish businesswomen
20th-century Danish businesspeople
21st-century Danish businesswomen
21st-century Danish businesspeople
Danish women business executives
20th-century Danish architects
21st-century Danish architects
Danish women architects
20th-century Danish women artists
20th-century Danish artists
21st-century Danish women artists